The 1889 Wisconsin Badgers football team represented the University of Wisconsin as an independent during the 1889 college football season. Led by Alvin Kletsch in his only season as head coach, the Badgers compiled a record of 0–2. 1889 was the first season of Wisconsin Badgers football. The team's captain was Charles Mayer.

Schedule

References

Wisconsin
Wisconsin Badgers football seasons
College football winless seasons
Wisconsin Badgers football